

380001–380100 

|-bgcolor=#f2f2f2
| colspan=4 align=center | 
|}

380101–380200 

|-bgcolor=#f2f2f2
| colspan=4 align=center | 
|}

380201–380300 

|-bgcolor=#f2f2f2
| colspan=4 align=center | 
|}

380301–380400 

|-bgcolor=#f2f2f2
| colspan=4 align=center | 
|}

380401–380500 

|-id=480
| 380480 Glennhawley ||  || Glenn Hawley (born 1951) has demonstrated leadership over decades in Canadian amateur astronomy. He served in many capacities in the Calgary Centre of the Royal Astronomical Society (RASC) and then on the national RASC Executive, culminating as President (2013–2014). || 
|}

380501–380600 

|-bgcolor=#f2f2f2
| colspan=4 align=center | 
|}

380601–380700 

|-id=607
| 380607 Sharma ||  || Amar Sharma (born 1984) has spent most of his life inspiring the citizens of India to look up at the night sky and reach for the stars. His efforts have included writing, television production, and lecturing. He teaches by example: his own observations have led to discoveries of new variable stars. || 
|}

380701–380800 

|-bgcolor=#f2f2f2
| colspan=4 align=center | 
|}

380801–380900 

|-bgcolor=#f2f2f2
| colspan=4 align=center | 
|}

380901–381000 

|-bgcolor=#f2f2f2
| colspan=4 align=center | 
|}

References 

380001-381000